Anthony Spillane (born 15 January 1960) is an Australian former cricketer. He played two List A matches for Tasmania between 1980 and 1981.

See also
 List of Tasmanian representative cricketers

References

External links
 

1960 births
Living people
Australian cricketers
Tasmania cricketers
Cricketers from Tasmania